1069 Planckia, provisional designation , is a background asteroid from the outer regions of the asteroid belt, approximately  in diameter. It was discovered on 28 January 1927, by astronomer Max Wolf at the Heidelberg-Königstuhl State Observatory in Germany. The asteroid was named after German physicist Max Planck.

Orbit and classification 

Planckia is a non-family asteroid from the main belt's background population. It orbits the Sun in the outer main-belt at a distance of 2.8–3.5 AU once every 5 years and 6 months (2,019 days; semi-major axis of 3.13 AU). Its orbit has an eccentricity of 0.11 and an inclination of 14° with respect to the ecliptic. The body's observation arc begins at Heidelberg in February 1927, or 10 days after its official discovery observation.

Naming 

This minor planet was named after noted German physicist Max Planck (1858–1947), on the commemoration of his 80th birthday. He was a professor of physics at Berlin University and the founder of quantum mechanics. In 1918, he received the Nobel prize in Physics. The official naming citation was mentioned in The Names of the Minor Planets by Paul Herget in 1955. He is also honored by a lunar crater Planck.

Physical characteristics 

In the SMASS classification, Planckia is a common, stony S-type asteroid.

Rotation period 

Between 2000 and 2010, several rotational lightcurves of Planckia were obtained from photometric observations by Brian Warner, Jérôme Caron and René Roy. Lightcurve analysis gave a consolidated rotation period of 8.665 hours with a brightness amplitude between 0.14 and 0.42 magnitude.

Diameter and albedo 

According to the surveys carried out by the Infrared Astronomical Satellite IRAS, the Japanese Akari satellite and the NEOWISE mission of NASA's Wide-field Infrared Survey Explorer, Planckia measures between 35.657 and 44.34 kilometers in diameter and its surface has an albedo between 0.1771 and 0.219.

The Collaborative Asteroid Lightcurve Link derives an albedo of 0.1982 and a diameter of 39.35 kilometers based on an absolute magnitude of 9.4.

Notes

References

External links 
 Lightcurve Database Query (LCDB), at www.minorplanet.info
 Dictionary of Minor Planet Names, Google books
 Asteroids and comets rotation curves, CdR – Geneva Observatory, Raoul Behrend
 Discovery Circumstances: Numbered Minor Planets (1)-(5000) – Minor Planet Center
 
 

001069
Discoveries by Max Wolf
Named minor planets
001069
19270128